Marino Amadori (born 9 April 1957) is an Italian former cyclist. He rode in 12 editions of the Giro d'Italia; his top result was 11th overall in 1979.

Major results

1979
 3rd GP Montelupo
1981
 1st Giro del Piemonte
 2nd Giro del Friuli
 3rd Overall Tirreno–Adriatico
1st Stage 1
 3rd Coppa Placci
1983
 1st Trofeo Matteotti
 1st Coppa Placci
1984
 3rd Giro del Lazio
 3rd Tre Valli Varesine
 3rd GP Montelupo
1985
 1st Coppa Sabatini
 2nd Giro dell'Umbria
 2nd Giro della Romagna
 2nd Gran Premio Città di Camaiore
 2nd Milano–Vignola
1986
 1st Coppa Agostoni
1987
 1st GP Industria & Artigianato di Larciano
 2nd Giro del Veneto

References

1957 births
Living people
Italian male cyclists
Sportspeople from the Province of Forlì-Cesena
Cyclists from Emilia-Romagna